"With These Hands" is a song written by Benny Davis and Abner Silver and performed by Eddie Fisher featuring Hugo Winterhalter and His Orchestra.  It reached number 7 on the U.S. pop chart in 1953.

The song ranked number 28 on Billboard magazine's Top 30 singles of 1953.

Other charting versions
Shirley Bassey released a version which reached number 38 on the UK Singles Chart in 1960.
Tom Jones released a version which reached number 3 on the adult contemporary chart, number 13 on the UK Singles Chart, and number 27 on the U.S. pop chart in 1965.

Other versions
The following additional artists have released recordings of the song:
The Mariners, release as a single in 1951, though it did not chart
Jo Stafford and Nelson Eddy featuring Paul Weston and His Orchestra, released as a single in 1951, though it did not chart.
Guy Lombardo and His Royal Canadians, released as the B-side to their 1951 single "Lonesome and Sorry"
Charlie Kunz, on his 1953 EP
Bob Haymes featuring Jimmy Carroll and His Orchestra, released as a single in 1954, though it did not chart
Johnnie Ray, on his 1954 album At the London Palladium
Jerry Lewis featuring Jack Pleis and His Orchestra released a version of the song as the B-side to their 1957 single "My Mammy".
Mantovani and His Orchestra, on their 1959 album Songs to Remember
Roger Williams, on his 1959 album With These Hands
Fela Sowande and His Quiet Rhythm, on their 1961 album Softly, Softly
Richard Tucker, released as the B-side to his 1962 single "The Exodus Song"
The Bachelors, on their 1964 album The Bachelors and 16 Great Songs
P. J. Proby, on his 1965 album P. J. Proby
The Harold Betters Sound, on his 1966 album Ram-Bunk-Shush
Sarah Vaughan, on her 1966 album The New Scene
The Temptations, on their 1967 album The Temptations in a Mellow Mood
Dionne Warwick, as part of a medley with "One Hand, One Heart" on her 1967 album On Stage and in the Movies
Hugh X. Lewis, as the B-side to his 1968 single "War Is Hell"
Jackie Wilson, on his 1968 album Do Your Thing
The Artistics, on their 1969 album What Happened
The Delfonics, on their 1969 album Sound of Sexy Soul
Les McCann, released as a single in 1969, though it did not chart
The Manhattans, on their 1970 album With These Hands
Frankie Vaughan, released as the B-side to his 1970 single "I'll Give You Three Guesses"
Jim Nabors, on his 1971 album For the Good Times - The Jim Nabors Hour
John Davidson, on his 1976 album Every Time I Sing a Love Song
Tammy Jones, on her 1978 album The Best of Tammy Jones
Lee Lawrence featuring Bruce Campbell and His Orchestra, on his 1983 album Fascination
André Hazes, on his 1984 album Zoals U Wenst Mevrouw!
Matt Monro, on his 1989 album A Time for Love
Joe Sample featuring Howard Hewett, on his 2002 album The Pecan Tree

In popular culture
Tom Jones's version was featured in the 1990 film Edward Scissorhands.
Proby's version was featured in the 2013 film The Oxbow Cure.

References

1951 songs
1951 singles
1953 singles
1954 singles
1960 singles
1965 singles
1969 singles
Songs written by Benny Davis
Songs written by Abner Silver
Eddie Fisher (singer) songs
Shirley Bassey songs
Tom Jones (singer) songs
Jo Stafford songs
Song recordings produced by Jimmy Bowen
Song recordings produced by Frank Wilson (musician)
Song recordings produced by Jeffrey Bowen
RCA Victor singles
Parrot Records singles
Columbia Records singles
Bell Records singles
Atlantic Records singles